Kattuviriyan is a 2008 Indian Tamil language horror drama film directed by Kalaipuli G. Sekaran. The film stars Malavika in dual roles, with Sajith Raj and Janaki Ram in further lead roles. The film was released on 28 March 2008.

Cast 
Malavika
Sajith Raj
Janaki Ram
Siva Chakravarthy
Alex
Kovai Senthil
Kalaipuli G. Sekaran
King Kong

Production
Malavika signed on to play a dual role in the film, and announced her interest in playing full-fledged roles, after receiving many offers to appear in item numbers following the success of her appearance in a song in Chithiram Pesuthadi (2006). It subsequently became her final role as the lead actress, before taking a sabbatical to get married and raise children, before a return in a supporting role in Golmaal (2023). The film marked the acting debut of Trichy-based doctor, Janaki Ram, who signed on to play a character in the film after approaching the director-producer Kalaipuli G. Sekaran. Janaki Ram worked on the film alongside his acting commitments in Brahma Deva (2009) and Moondram Pournami (2023), which eventually had a delayed release.

Production on the film began in February 2007, with Malavika taking on roles as a police offer and a student in the film. In March 2007, Malavika shot scenes for the film at a cremation ground in Mylapore. The shoot of the film took place in locations such as Chennai, Aarani, Kudiyatham and Thekkady.

Release
The film opened on 28 March 2008 across Tamil Nadu. A critic from film entertainment portal Behindwoods noted "a movie like this rides entirely on the tightness of the script and the director’s abilities to keep us on a knife’s edge", but "the script and the story are sadly a let down". The critic added "however, the movie has some positives, the main element being the director’s handling of certain scenes that were aimed at raising our heart rates" and "the director has been successful in evoking fear wherever he has intended to and the element of suspense too has been maintained".

In 2012, Janaki Ram prepared the film for release in Telugu under the title of Nippulanti Nijam. It was revealed that Telugu version was directed by Kumar Ponnada and produced by Arjun Reddy, with musical scores rendered by Sekhar and Chinni Krishna. Janaki Ram shot for an extra song featuring Mumaith Khan, with an audio release function taking place in Hyderabad during May 2012.

References

External links 

2000s horror drama films
2000s Tamil-language films
2008 films
Indian horror drama films